Shrine of Hercules Curinus was a Roman temple, the ruins of which are located in the comune of Sulmona, in the province of L'Aquila in the Abruzzo region of Italy.

References

External links

Roman sites of Abruzzo
Sulmona
National museums of Italy